The 2020 USA Indoor Track and Field Championships were held at the Albuquerque Convention Center in Albuquerque, New Mexico. Organized by USA Track and Field (USATF), the two-day competition took place from February 14 to February 15 and serves as the national championships in track and field for the United States. 

The heptathlon and pentathlon being contested as part of the 2020 USATF Indoor Combined Events Championships will be held February 7-8, 2020 at the United States Naval Academy’s Wesley Brown Field House in Annapolis, Maryland.

Schedule

Entry Standards
Events in bold will be contested at the Championships.

November 17, 2019 - February 9, 2020 window.

Male medalist

Female medalist

Keturah Orji set the American record  in the second round.

Qualification

The 2020 USA Indoor Track and Field Championships serve as the qualification meet for United States representatives in international competitions, including the 2020 IAAF World Indoor Championships from 13 to 15 March 2020 in Nanjing, China. In order to be entered, athletes need to achieve a qualifying standard mark and place in the top 2 in their event and top 12 in the world. The United States team, as managed by USATF, can also bring a qualified back up athlete in case one of the team members is unable to perform.

Additionally, defending 2019 IAAF World Indoor Tour Winner (received a wildcard spot subject to ratification by their country) and World Champions received byes into the 2020 World Championships. The athletes eligible for a bye are:

Defending World Champions
 Courtney Okolo - 400 m
 Will Claye - Triple Jump
 Christian Coleman - 60 m
 Kendra Harrison - 60 m hurdles
 Sandi Morris - Pole Vault

Defending World Tour Winner
 Nathan Strother - 400 m
 Jarret Eaton - 60 m hurdles

References

External links
 2020 USATF Indoor Track and Field Championships Home Page

2020
Track and field indoor
USA Indoor Track and Field Championships
USA Indoor Track and Field Championships
Sports in Albuquerque, New Mexico
Track and field in New Mexico
Events in Albuquerque, New Mexico